Arua is a city and commercial centre within the Arua District in the Northern Region of Uganda.

Location
The geographical coordinates of the city of Arua are 03°02'07.0"N,  30°54'39.0"E (Latitude:3.035278; Longitude:30.910833). Arua is closely bordered to the Democratic Republic of Congo in the west and South Sudan in the north which makes it a strategic location for business between Uganda and her two neighbors to the west and north.

Due to its strategic location, Arua is also part of the Refugee program of hosting up to 20% of refugees entering into Uganda, annually.

Overview

Arua is an important base for non-governmental organizations working in the West Nile sub-region or serving Western Equatoria in South Sudan and the northeastern Democratic Republic of the Congo. It became an important commercial supply centre and transport route when the Juba - Yei - Morobo - Kaya Road opened, enabling supplies to come into Juba from the south on the Kaya Highway instead of through Khartoum from the north.

Transport

A branch of the Uganda Railways was to be extended to Arua sometime after 1964, but there has been no passenger rail service in Uganda for many years.

The Vurra–Arua–Koboko–Oraba Road passes through town, in a south/north direction. Arua is connected to the other towns in West Nile by road. These are: Nebbi, Pakwach, Paidha, Koboko, Yumbe, Moyo, Obongi, Adjumani and other smaller towns. There is regular road transport between Arua and Kampala, Gulu, Masindi and Hoima 

The city is served by Arua Airport, which has scheduled air service. Arua airport has been the second busiest in Uganda after Entebbe. It was due to be upgraded to an international airport.

Population 
The 1969 national census enumerated the population of Arua Town at 10,837. In 1991, the census enumerated 22,217 people in the town. In 2002, the population had increased to 43,929. The August 2014 national census and household survey enumerated the population of Arua Town Council at 61,962. In 2020, the Uganda Bureau of Statistics (UBOS) estimated the mid-year population to be 72,400. UBOS calculated that the population of Arua Municipality grew at an average rate of 2.7 percent annually, between 2014 and 2020.

Climate
Arua has a tropical savanna climate (Köppen climate classification Aw).

Activities

Administrative activities
The following administrations are seated in Arua:
 offices of the Arua Town Council
 headquarters of Arua District
 headquarters of the Roman Catholic Diocese of Arua and the Church of Uganda's Madi West Nile Diocese

Other business and educational activities
 Arua Campus of the Makerere University Business School
 Uganda Christian University Arua Campus in Ringili at St. Paul's Theological College
 Arua Campus of Bugema University
 main campus of Muni University, the sixth public university established by the government of Uganda
 Kuluva School of Nursing and Midwifery
 a campus of the Islamic University in Uganda
 a branch of PostBank Uganda
 an office of the National Social Security Fund
 Arua central market
 Arua Currency Center, a currency storage and processing facility, owned and operated by the Bank of Uganda, Uganda's central bank.
 Arua Hospital, a 128-bed public, regional referral hospital administered by the Uganda Ministry of Health
 Ragem Beach

Media

Analog broadcasts, which originate from Kampala, include WBS TV (which is currently closed), UBC TV, and NTV. In early 2014, MBC 2 was aired in Arua as a test broadcast to pave way for Vision Group's Urban TV.

Voice of Life, a Church of Uganda-founded radio station, has pioneered FM broadcasting in Arua since 1997.

See also 

 List of radio stations in Uganda
 Lado Enclave
 Railway stations in Uganda
 West Nile sub-region
 List of cities and towns in Uganda

References

External links 

 Website of Arua District
New Cities Raise Great Expectations In Investments, Revenue As of 23 May 2019.

 
Arua District
West Nile sub-region
Populated places in Northern Region, Uganda